Cnaphalocrocis bilinealis is a species of moth of the family Crambidae. It was described from India, but has also been recorded from Queensland in Australia, China, Malaysia, Sri Lanka and the Democratic Republic of the Congo.

Adults are buff coloured, with broad brown wing margins. There are three brown lines across each forewing and two across each hindwing.

The larvae feed on Oryza sativa.

References

Moths described in 1891
Spilomelinae